The 2018 NCAA Division III Men's Ice Hockey Tournament was the culmination of the 2017–18 season, the 35th such tournament in NCAA history. It concluded with St. Norbert defeating Salve Regina in the championship game 3-2 in double overtime. All First Round and Quarterfinal matchups were held at home team venues, while all succeeding games were played at the Herb Brooks Arena in Lake Placid, New York.

Qualifying teams
Twelve teams qualified for the tournament in the following ways: (Pool A) seven teams received bids as a result of being conference tournament champions from conferences that possessed an automatic bid. (Pool B) one team was selected from two conferences that did not possess an automatic bid. (Pool C) four teams from conferences that possessed an automatic bid received at-large invitations based upon their records.

Format
The tournament featured four rounds of play. All rounds were Single-game elimination.

Because at least four western teams qualified, the tournament was arranged so that there were two eastern and two western quarterfinal brackets. The top two teams from each region were placed in separate quarterfinal brackets and then arranged so that were all to reach the semifinals the top western seed would play the second eastern seed and vise versa.

Since five western teams and seven eastern teams qualified for the tournament, three western teams received byes into the quarterfinal round while one eastern team was advanced to the second round. In the first round, the fourth- and fifth-seeded western teams played with the winner advancing to play the top western seed. The second- and third-seeded western teams would play one another in the other western quarterfinal bracket.

The eastern teams were arranged so that the second seed would play the seventh seed, the third seed would play the sixth seed and the fourth seed would play the fifth seed. The winner between the fourth- and fifth-seeded eastern teams would play the top eastern seed while the winner between the third- and sixth-seeded eastern teams would play the victor of the second- and seventh-seeded match.

In the First Round and Quarterfinals the higher-seeded team served as host.

Tournament Bracket

Note: * denotes overtime period(s)

All-Tournament Team
G: Blake Wojtala (Salve Regina)
D: Luke Davison (St. Norbert)
D: Vincenzo Renda (Salve Regina)
F: Dominick Sacco (St. Norbert)
F: Erik Udahl (Salve Regina)
F: Tanner Froese* (St. Norbert)
* Most Outstanding Player(s)

Record by conference

References

External links
Division III Men's Ice Hockey Record Book

 
NCAA Division III ice hockey